Siri Frost Sterri (born 20 September 1944 in Trondheim) is a Norwegian politician for the Conservative Party.

She was elected to the Norwegian Parliament from Sør-Trøndelag in 1985, and was re-elected on three occasions. She had previously served in the position of deputy representative during the term 1981–1985.

Sterri was a deputy member of the executive committee of Malvik municipality council from 1975 to 1979, as well as a member of Sør-Trøndelag county council during the term 1979–1983.

References

1944 births
Living people
Politicians from Trondheim
Women members of the Storting
Conservative Party (Norway) politicians
Members of the Storting
21st-century Norwegian politicians
21st-century Norwegian women politicians
20th-century Norwegian politicians
20th-century Norwegian women politicians